The 1957 Chico State Wildcats football team represented Chico State College—now known as California State University, Chico—as a member of the Far Western Conference (FWC) during the 1957 NCAA College Division football season. Led by Gus Manolis in his fourth and final season as head coach, Chico State compiled an overall record of 7–2 with a mark of 4–1 in conference play, placing second in the FWC. The team was outscored its opponents 195 to 109 for the season. The Wildcats played home games at College Field in Chico, California.

Manolis died on January 28, 1958, near Alder Springs, California, after suffering an apparent heart attack while helping with the search for a missing boy in Grindstone Canyon in the Mendocino National Forest. He finished his tenure as Chico State with an overall record of 23–12–1, for a .653 winning percentage.

Schedule

Notes

References

Chico State
Chico State Wildcats football seasons
Chico State Wildcats football